Neckar-Zaber is an electoral constituency (German: Wahlkreis) represented in the Bundestag. It elects one member via first-past-the-post voting. Under the current constituency numbering system, it is designated as constituency 266. It is located in northern Baden-Württemberg, comprising the southern part of the Landkreis Heilbronn district and the northern part of the Ludwigsburg district.

Neckar-Zaber was created for the 1980 federal election. Since 2021, it has been represented by Fabian Gramling of the Christian Democratic Union (CDU).

Geography
Neckar-Zaber is located in northern Baden-Württemberg. As of the 2021 federal election, it comprises the municipalities of Abstatt, Beilstein, Brackenheim, Cleebronn, Flein, Güglingen, Ilsfeld, Lauffen am Neckar, Leingarten, Neckarwestheim, Nordheim, Pfaffenhofen, Talheim, Untergruppenbach, and Zaberfeld from the Landkreis Heilbronn district, as well as the municipalities of Affalterbach, Benningen am Neckar, Besigheim, Bietigheim-Bissingen, Bönnigheim, Erdmannhausen, Erligheim, Freiberg am Neckar, Freudental, Gemmrigheim, Großbottwar, Hessigheim, Ingersheim, Kirchheim am Neckar, Löchgau, Marbach am Neckar, Mundelsheim, Murr, Oberstenfeld, Pleidelsheim, Sachsenheim, Steinheim an der Murr, Tamm, and Walheim from the Ludwigsburg district.

History
Neckar-Zaber was created in 1980 and contained parts of the redistributed constituencies of Ludwigsburg and Heilbronn. In the 1980 through 1998 elections, it was constituency 170 in the numbering system. In the 2002 and 2005 elections, it was number 267. Since the 2009 election, it has been number 266.

Originally, the constituency had a configuration similar to its current borders, but lacking the municipalities of Flein, Talheim, and Leingarten from the Landkreis Heilbronn district. In the 1998 election, it acquired the Flein and Talheim municipalities. In the 2005 election, it acquired the Leingarten municipality.

Members
The constituency was first represented by Renate Hellwig of the Christian Democratic Union (CDU) from 1980 to 1998. Hans Martin Bury of the Social Democratic Party (SPD) was elected in 1998 and served one term. Eberhard Gienger of the CDU was representative from 2002 to 2021. He was succeeded by Fabian Gramling in 2021.

Election results

2021 election

2017 election

2013 election

2009 election

References

Federal electoral districts in Baden-Württemberg
1980 establishments in West Germany
Constituencies established in 1980
Heilbronn (district)
Ludwigsburg (district)